The Adult Storybook is an album by New Tokyo Terror, a project of Joanna Wang.  The album was included as a second disc in the release of Joanna & Wang Ruo-lin, her second album.  Wang has stated that the songs that became The Adult Storybook were the work she sought to release as her second album, but her record company insisted on material that they saw as more commercial: 'My own album ended up being a "buy one get this as a bonus disc" next to the array of songs we ended up adding.'

Track listing
All songs written and composed by Joanna Wang.

"Adult Crap" – 3:39
"I Guess I'm Paranoid" – 2:57 f
"Longing For Romance" – 3:27
"His Remedy" – 3:17
"Nobody's A Nun" – 3:08
"Even If We Did" – 4:47
"How I Feel About Businessmen" – 2:15
"Man" – 2:21
"Palpitation" – 3:39
"I'm Pathetic Enough" – 4:52
"Thoughts Of A Teacher" - 0:37 (Hidden track)

Personnel
Joanna Wang - vocals
Roger Joseph Manning Jr. - piano, electric piano, organ, harmonium, keyboard
Freddy Koella - acoustic guitar, electric guitar, banjo
Paul Bushnell - bass, whistling
Brian MacLeod - drums, percussion

Production
Producers - Bing Wang, Joanna Wang
Engineer - Eric Corne
Second engineers - Sadaharu Yagi, John Nuss 
Mixing - Craig Burbidge, Eric Corne
Mastering - Pete Doell
Album design - Joanna Wang, S.M. Cumberworth

References

2009 albums
Joanna Wang albums